Shatskikh or Shatskykh ( or Шатских) is a surname.
 Aleksandr Shatskikh (1974–2020), Kazakhstani footballer
 Maksim Shatskikh (born 1978), Uzbekistani footballer
 Oleg Shatskikh (born 1974), Uzbekistani footballer
 Volodymyr Shatskykh (born 1981), Ukrainian wrestler

See also
 
 

Russian-language surnames